Paul Morton (May 22, 1857 – January 19, 1911) was a U.S. businessman, and served as the 36th Secretary of the Navy under Theodore Roosevelt.

Biography
He served as the U.S. Secretary of the Navy between 1904 and 1905.  Previous to this, he had been vice president of the Santa Fe Railroad.  When it came to light that the Santa Fe had given illegal rebates under Morton, he was forced out of the cabinet to avoid scandal, though Roosevelt maintained that Morton himself was unaware of the improprieties. After leaving government service, Morton was President of Equitable Life Assurance Society.

Born in Detroit, Michigan, and growing up in Nebraska City, Nebraska, he was the younger brother of Joy Morton, founder of Morton Salt, and the son of J. Sterling Morton, former Acting Governor of Nebraska, founder of Arbor Day, and Secretary of Agriculture under President Grover Cleveland. Though his father was a "Bourbon" (i.e. conservative) Democrat, Paul Morton was a Progressive Republican. This shift of party by father/son cabinet secretaries is paralleled by that of Henry Cantwell Wallace, who served as a Progressive Republican Secretary of Agriculture under Harding and Coolidge, and his son Henry A. Wallace who served in the same office as a Democrat under Franklin D. Roosevelt.

George Burroughs Torrey painted a portrait of him.

Paul Morton died in New York City on January 19, 1911.

References

 Dictionary of American Biography, Under the Auspices of the American Council of Learned Societies, C. Scribner's Sons, New York City, 1928.

External links

 

1857 births
1911 deaths
United States Secretaries of the Navy
American businesspeople
Theodore Roosevelt administration cabinet members
20th-century American politicians
New York (state) Republicans
People from Nebraska City, Nebraska
Burials at Woodlawn Cemetery (Bronx, New York)
Nebraska politicians